Mo Dao Zu Shi is a donghua series based on the novel of the same name written by Mo Xiang Tong Xiu. It is produced by Tencent Penguin Pictures and B.C May Pictures. The series depicts a fictional Xianxia world where humans attempt to cultivate to a state of immortality, known as Xian. The protagonist of the series, Wei Wuxian, due to certain circumstances, deviated from the conventional cultivation path to Xian, and eventually created Modao (the Demonic Path).

The first season, titled Qian Chen Pian, aired from July 9 to October 6, 2018, on Tencent Video for 15 episodes. The second season, titled Xian Yun Pian, aired from August 3 to August 31, 2019, for 8 episodes. A chibi series, titled Mo Dao Zu Shi Q, aired from July 31, 2020, to January 29, 2021, and ran for 30 episodes. The third and final season, titled Wán Jié Piān, aired from August 7 to October 16, 2021, for 12 episodes.

Synopsis
Despite his efforts during the Sunshot Campaign to bring down the tyrannical Wen Clan, Wei Wuxian (魏无羡) was feared by the world for the unorthodox cultivation path he created. Thirteen years after he was killed, he is summoned into the body of a man called Mo Xuanyu (莫玄羽), who was rejected by his clan and despised by his family, therefore sacrificing his own body to Wei Wuxian so he would be avenged. It is in the Mo house where Wei Wuxian comes across a dismembered left arm causing death and havoc. His attempts to uncover the mystery of the left arm will guide him to a familiar face from the past with whom he will embark on a journey that will lead them to unravel what lies behind the tragic events that caused the deaths of so many - including Wei Wuxian himself.

Episodes

Characters

Main characters
Wei Ying (魏婴), courtesy name Wuxian (无羡)
Voiced by: Lu Zhixing (audio drama), Zhang Jie (donghua), Shim Gyuhyuk (Korean dub), Tatsuhisa Suzuki (Japanese drama cd), Kimura Ryohei (Japanese dub)

Wei Wuxian is the protagonist of the series. He is the founder of the Demonic Path (鬼道), earning him the title Yiling Laozu (夷陵老祖). He is intelligent, optimistic, mischievous but good-hearted. Talented and infamous, his unorthodox methods and unrestrained nature put him at odds with the rest of the cultivation world. Orphaned at a young age and taken in by his parents’ friend Jiang Fengmian, Wei Wuxian is raised in the Yunmeng Jiang Clan, where he becomes head disciple and grows up with Jiang Cheng and Jiang Yanli. During his education as a teenager, he travels to Gusu to study at Cloud Recesses and meets Lan Wangji, with whom he develops a tentative friendship, and later misunderstandings.
After the Qishan Wen Clan launches an aggressive campaign to subjugate all other cultivation clans, Wei Wuxian becomes a war hero through his use of demonic methods. Other clans covet and distrust his novel power; he further antagonizes them by protecting the survivors of the Wen Clan and dies an enemy of the cultivation world. 13 years later, he is resurrected into the body of Mo Xuanyu and must unravel a murder mystery alongside his old friend, Lan Wangji.

Lan Zhan (蓝湛), courtesy name Wangji (忘机).
Voiced by: Wei Chao (audio drama), Bian Jiang (donghua), Ryu Seunggon (Korean dub), Satoshi Hino (Japanese drama cd), Shinnosuke Tachibana (Japanese dub)
Lan Wangji, titled Hanguang-Jun (含光君), is the second young master and one of the Twin Jades of the Gusu Lan Clan. Despite having an exquisite bearing and incomparable beauty, his strict and aloof nature makes him appear nonchalant and distant. He is renowned for his skill in battle and for his strong moral compass, known to be "where the chaos is" for aiding citizens without caring for fame or glory of Night Hunts. During his youth, he has various encounters with Wei Wuxian wherein they appear to have very little similarities in personalities and interests. Things turn out differently however, and Lan Wangji develops romantic feelings towards Wei Wuxian which remain unknown to the latter as their misunderstandings develop.

At the beginning of the story, Lan Wangji is a teacher of Lan Clan disciples; he first appears at Mo Village when they are attacked by a mysterious demonic arm, and reunites with the resurrected Wei Wuxian whom he protects and grows closer to as they unravel the mystery.

Gusu Lan Clan
Lan Clan of Gusu (姑苏蓝氏) is a cultivation clan based in the Cloud Recesses (云深不知处), a residence on a remote mountain outside the city of Gusu. All disciples wear a white band across their foreheads. Additional embroidery of the clan emblem adorns the headbands of inner disciples, who are from the inner family.

Clan Motto: Upright; Righteous (雅正)

Clan Emblem: Rolling Clouds (卷云纹)

Lan Huan (蓝涣), courtesy name Xichen (曦臣).
Voiced by: Wang Kai (audio drama), Jin Xian (donghua), Kim Youngsun (Korean dub), Morikawa Toshiyuki (Japanese dub, drama cd)

Lan Xichen is the leader of the Lan Clan. Titled Zewu-Jun (泽芜君), he is one of the Three Zun (三尊) alongside his sworn brothers Nie Mingjue and Jin Guangyao, the latter of with whom he shares an especially close relationship. He has a warm and trusting personality.

Lan Qiren (蓝启仁)
Voiced by: Song Ming (audio drama), Liu Cong (donghua), Lee Changmin (Korean dub), Shingaki Tarusuke (Japanese drama cd), Sakamaki Mitsuhiro (Japanese dub)

Lan Qiren is an elder of the Lan Clan, a strict teacher known for producing outstanding students. After his brother Qingheng Jun (青蘅君) went into seclusion, he acted as de facto leader of the clan. He also raised his nephews Lan Xichen and Lan Wangji whom he taught to tirelessly learn and obey the rules of the clan.

Lan Yuan (蓝愿), courtesy name Sizhui (思追)
Voiced by: Qian Wenqing (audio drama), Chengzhang Taikang (donghua), Nam Doh-hyeong (Korean dub), Yūsuke Kobayashi (Japanese drama cd), Shimba Tsuchiya (Japanese dub)

Lan Sizhui is a teenage inner disciple of the Lan Clan. He is intelligent and even-tempered. He admires Lan Wangji whom he sees as a big brother or father figure and quickly takes a liking to “Mo Xuanyu” as Wei Wuxian. He is close friends with Lan Jingyi and later with Jin Ling.

Lan Jingyi (蓝景仪)
Voiced by: Cao Xupeng (audio drama), Wang Chenguang (donghua), Jeong Joo-won (Korean dub), Hiro Shimono (Japanese drama cd), Saito Soma (Japanese dub)

Lan Jingyi is a disciple of the Lan Clan. He is short-tempered and dislikes rule breakers. He is close friends with Lan Sizhui and later with Jin Ling.

Lanling Jin Clan
Jin Clan of Lanling (兰陵金氏) is a cultivation clan based in Golden Carp Tower, Lanling.

Meng Yao (孟瑶), legitimized as Jin Guangyao (金光瑶)
Voiced by: Jiang Guangtao (audio drama), Yang Tianxiang (donghua), Lee Hosan (Korean dub), Ishida Akira (Japanese dub, drama cd)

Titled Lianfang-Zun (敛芳尊), Jin Guangyao is the leader of the Jin Clan and the first Chief Cultivator (仙督), the leader of all cultivation clans. Initially illegitimate, he was formally recognized by his father Jin Guangshan and accepted into the Jin family due to his wartime accomplishments. He is Jin Ling’s paternal uncle and also one of Three Zun alongside his sworn brothers Lan Xichen and Nie Mingjue. He is an intelligent and competent ruler, but many look down on him due to his status as the son of a prostitute. He shares an especially close relationship with Lan Xichen due to the latter’s nonjudgmental nature.

Jin Ling (金凌), courtesy name Rulan (如兰)
Voiced by: Li Lanling (audio drama), Su Shangqing (donghua), Lee Kyungtae (Korean dub), Murase Ayumu (Japanese drama cd), Kaji Yuki (Japanese dub)

Jin Ling is a disciple of the Jin Clan and the heir to the Jin clan. He is the son of Jiang Yanli and Jin Zixuan and the nephew of both Jin Guangyao and Jiang Cheng. He has a spiritual dog named Fairy, given to him by Jin Guangyao. He is prideful and short-tempered and initially has troublegetting along with his peers and he doesn't have many friends his age. He takes a liking to Wei Wuxian when he returns as "Mo Xuanyu." He also becomes close friends with Lan Sizhui and Lan Jingyi.

Jin Guangshan (金光善)
Voiced by: Xiao Tan (audio drama), Li Longbin (donghua), Park Sanghoon (Korean dub), Hayami Sho (Japanese dub, drama cd)

Jin Guangshan was the former leader of the Jin Clan whose ambitions rivaled Wen Ruohan's. He viciously punished the remainder of the Wen Clan after the war and clashed with Wei Wuxian over their treatment. A womanizer, he had three known children from affairs: Meng Yao, Mo Xuanyu, and Qin Su. Jin Zixuan was his only legitimate son until he legitimized Meng Yao.

Jin Zixuan (金子轩)
Voiced by: Liu Mingyue (audio drama), Gu Jiangshan (donghua), Kim Hyunwook (Korean dub), Hiroki Takahashi (Japanese drama cd), Kenji Akabane (Japanese dub)

Jin Zixuan was Jin Guangshan's son and heir to the Jin Clan, as well as Jiang Yanli's husband and the father of Jin Ling. He initially clashed with Wei Wuxian due to his brash personality.
An outstanding talent, Jin Zixuan initially disdained the betrothal he had to Jiang Yanli, whom he viewed as unremarkable, but he gradually grew to love her after understanding her true character. He died when Jin Ling was still a toddler.

Qin Su (秦愫)

Qin Su is the wife of Jin Guangyao and the daughter of Qin Cangye, the leader of the Laoling Qin Clan, a subsidiary of the Jin Clan. They married after Jin Guangyao saved her life during the war.

Mo Xuanyu (莫玄羽)
Voiced by: Tong Xin (audio drama), Zhang Jie (donghua), Shim Gyu Hyuk (Korean dub), Nakayama Kazuhisa (Japanese drama cd), Kimura Ryohei (Japanese dub)

Mo Xuanyu was one of Jin Guangshan's illegitimate sons and a former disciple of the Jin Clan. He sacrificed his soul to summon Wei Wuxian to exact revenge on the Mo family for abusing him. In his living days, he was seen as a lunatic and a "cut-sleeve."

Qinghe Nie Clan
Nie Clan of Qinghe (清河聂氏) is a cultivation clan that resides in the Unclean Realm.

Nie Huaisang (聂怀桑)
Voiced by: Qi Sijia (audio drama), Liu Sanmu (donghua), Kim Myungjoon (Korean dub), Matsuoka Yoshitsugu (Japanese drama cd), Natsuki Hanae (Japanese dub)

Nie Huaisang is the current leader of the Nie Clan and the younger half-brother of Nie Mingjue, as well as an old school friend of Wei Wuxian with whom he often slacked off. Known for his incompetence, he is widely called Head Shaker (一问三不知, literally: one question, three “don't know”s).

Nie Mingjue (聂明玦)
Voiced by: Feng Sheng (audio drama), Guan Shu'ai (donghua), Lee Hyeon (Korean dub), Tsuda Kenjiro (Japanese drama cd), Hiroshi Shirokuma (Japanese dub)

Titled Chifeng-Zun (赤锋尊), Nie Mingjue was the former leader of the Nie Clan and the older half-brother of Nie Huaisang. He is one of the Three Zun alongside his sworn brothers Jin Guangyao and Lan Xichen. He was strict with a bad temper and an intolerance for anything deviating from his definition of morality. He publicly experienced a qi deviation, common in his clan, and disappeared soon thereafter. He is presumed dead at the beginning of the novel.

Qishan Wen Clan
Wen Clan of Qishan (岐山温氏) is a cultivation clan based in the Nightless City (不夜天城). The clan was destroyed during the Sunshot Campaign, where some survivors, specifically Wen Ning and Wen Qing's family branch, were taken under the wing of Wuxian.

Clan Emblem: the Sun, meaning to compete with the sun and to live as long as the sun (与日争辉，与日同寿)

Wen Ning (温宁), courtesy name Qionglin (琼林).
Voiced by: Teng Xin (audio drama), Shao Tong (donghua), Kim Jiyul (Korean dub), Hoshi Soichiro (Japanese drama cd), Nobunaga Shimazaki (Japanese dub)

Wen Ning is a branch family member of the Wen Clan and Wen Qing's younger brother. When he was alive, he was a stutterer and shy around people. In his youth, he met Wei Wuxian during an archery tournament, and later protected both him and Jiang Cheng during the Siege of Lotus Pier. After the downfall of the Wen clan, he was sent to one of the Jin Clan’s forced labor camps and murdered. Wei Wuxian later resurrected him as a fierce corpse, and he became known as the Ghost General (鬼将军).

Wen Qing (温情)
Voiced by: Shan Xin (audio drama), Qiao Shiyu (donghua), Kim Yul (Korean dub), Ayako Kawasumi (Japanese dub)

Wen Qing was a branch family member of the Wen clan and Wen Ning's older sister. She was the greatest physician of the Wen Clan. When Wei Wuxian and Jiang Cheng were on the run, after Wen Ning's insistence she sheltered them at the risk of being punished for betrayal to the main Wen Clan.

Wen Ruohan (温若寒)

Voiced by: Chen Siyu (audio drama), Yan Ming (donghua), Kim Jinhong (Korean dub), Miyake Kenta (Japanese dub)

Wen Ruohan was the previous clan leader of the Wen Clan, and father to Wen Xu and Wen Chao. He was a known megalomaniac with an unpredictable temper.

Wen Xu (温旭)

Wen Xu was the eldest son of Wen Ruohan. He burnt the Cloud Recesses during the Wen Clan’s aggressive expansive campaign. Eventually, he was decapitated by Nie Mingjue.

Wen Chao (温晁)
Voiced by: Hao Xianghai (audio drama), Liang Xiaoqiang (donghua), Kim Jinhong (Korean dub), Hiroyuki Yoshino (Japanese dub)

Wen Chao was the youngest son of Wen Ruohan. He enjoyed harassing women and clashed with Wei Wuxian who protected Mianmian (绵绵) from him. He laid siege to Lotus Pier, successfully occupying it and killing Jiang Fengmian, Yu Ziyuan, and many other cultivators. This forced Wei Wuxian, Jiang Cheng and Jiang Yanli into hiding. He later hunted down Wei Wuxian and threw him into the Burial Mounds (乱葬岗).

Zhao Zhuliu (赵逐流), renamed as Wen Zhuliu (温逐流)
Voiced by: Wang Minna (audio drama), Hu Yajie (donghua), Keikō Sakai (Japanese dub)

Wen Zhuliu was a servant of the Wen Clan and adopted into the Wen family. He was one of Wen Chao's protectors. He was a formidable cultivator and commonly known as Core-Melting Hand (化丹手) due to his ability to melt a Golden Core.

Wang Lingjiao (王灵娇)
Voiced by: Yan Mengmeng (audio drama), Qiu Qiu (donghua), Gang Sihyeon (Korean dub), Asumi Kana (Japanese dub)

Wang Lingjiao was a former maid of Wen Chao's official wife and later his favorite lover. She was arrogant and pompous. She vindictively tried to sacrifice Mianmian after seeing Wen Chao flirt with her and later tried to intimidate Yu Ziyuan.

Yunmeng Jiang Clan
Jiang Clan of Yunmeng (云梦江氏) is a cultivation clan located in Yunmeng's Lotus Pier (莲花坞).

Clan Motto: Knowing it's impossible, attempt to achieve it (明知不可为而为之)

Clan Emblem: Nine petal lotus (九瓣莲）

Jiang Cheng (江澄), courtesy name Wanyin (晚吟),
Voiced by: Peng Yao (audio drama), Guo Haoran (donghua), Jang Min-hyeok (Korean dub), Midorikawa Hikaru (Japanese dub, drama cd)

Titled Sandu Shengshou (三毒圣手), Jiang Cheng is the current leader of the Jiang Clan. He is the brother of Jiang Yanli, the martial brother of Wei Wuxian, and the maternal uncle of Jin Ling, whom he is very protective of. He is a quick-tempered and sharp-tongued man, who nevertheless cares deeply for his family, being described by the author as having a knife mouth and tofu heart. He grew up close to Jiang Yanli and Wei Wuxian, all three having been raised in the Jiang Clan household together. After the fall of Lotus Pier, he became the new clan leader and played a major role in the Sunshot Campaign. After the war, he grew apart from Wei Wuxian during a series of events, where Wei Wuxian defected from the Jiang Clan in order to not get them under crossfire for his actions during and after the war. At the start of the novel, he obsessively searches for Wei Wuxian, as he believes the latter will find a way to return to the world of the living.

Jiang Yanli (江厌离)
Voiced by: Qiao Shiyu (audio drama), Li Shimeng (donghua), Kang Eun-ae (Korean dub), Taketatsu Ayana (Japanese drama cd), Saori Hayami (Japanese dub)

Jiang Yanli was the daughter of Jiang Fengmian and Yu Ziyuan, the older sister of Jiang Cheng, and the martial sister of Wei Wuxian. She was known to be of average looks and weak cultivation base, but was a very kind person with a penchant for cooking. Jiang Cheng and Wei Wuxian idolized her. She was initially smitten with Jin Zixuan, but her father Jiang Fengmian broke off the engagement after realizing that Jin Zixuan felt no affection for his daughter. After the Sunshot Campaign, Jin Zixuan developed feelings for her, and they were wed. They had a son, Jin Ling, but she died to save Wei Wuxian's life during the Bloodbath in Nightless City, when Jin Ling was only a baby.

Jiang Fengmian (江枫眠)
Voiced by: Zhang Zhen (audio drama), Tang Shuiyu (donghua), Seo Wonseok (Korean dub), Kenji Hamada (Japanese dub)

Jiang Fengmian was the former leader of the Jiang Clan, the husband of Yu Ziyuan, and the father of Jiang Cheng and Jiang Yanli. He was friends with Wei Wuxian's father, Wei Changze, who was a servant of the clan. He was also familiar with Wei Wuxian's mother, Cangse Sanren, whom he had once held romantic feelings for. Upon hearing that both had died on a Night Hunt, he dedicated himself to finding their son. He eventually found Wei Wuxian on the streets of Yiling and fed him a piece of melon before taking him home to Lotus Pier. Because he favored Wei Wuxian in comparison to his own son, Jiang Cheng, he and Yu Ziyuan often argued. Along with his wife, he died at the Wen Clan's hands during the Massacre at the Lotus Pier.

Yu Ziyuan (虞紫鸢)
Voiced by: Zhang Kai (audio drama), Ji Guanlin (donghua), Jeon Suk-kyeong (Korean dub), Tanaka Atsuko (Japanese drama cd), Takako Honda (Japanese dub)

Yu Ziyuan was the wife of Jiang Fengmian, and mother of Jiang Cheng and Jiang Yanli. She was harsh on her family and clan’s disciples. Titled Violet Spider (紫蜘蛛), she was a formidable and famous cultivator. Due to her husband's favoritism of Wei Wuxian over their own son, she had a poor relationship with Wei Wuxian. Upon the Wen Clan's invasion of Lotus Pier and Wang Lingjiao demand for Wei Wuxian’s punishment, Yu Ziyuan whipped the latter but ultimately refused to cut off his hand. She subsequently fought the invaders to the death. During her final moments, she told Wei Wuxian to protect Jiang Cheng with his life.

Yi City Arc
During Wei Wuxian and Lan Wangji's mission, they arrived at Yi City (义城) and bumped into Lan Sizhui, Lan Jingyi, Jin Ling and some other disciples from different clans during their night hunt. From there, they uncover the truth of Xiao Xingchen's death.

Xue Yang (薛洋), courtesy name Chengmei (成美).
Voiced by: Hui Long (audio drama), Kondo Takashi (Japanese drama cd), Kouki Uchiyama (Japanese dub)

Xue Yang is a guest of the Jin Clan who recreated the destroyed half of the Yin Tiger Tally. He is found by Xiao Xingchen and A-Qing while injured and unconscious. As the two did not know his real identity, he used Xiao Xingchen's blindness to his advantage and ended up living with them for years through deception. However, he was exposed when A-Qing witnessed his fight with Song Lan. He then fought with Xiao Xingchen and revealed the truth. This caused Xiao Xingchen to commit suicide. As Xue Yang was unable to turn him into a fierce corpse, he stored his shattered soul in a spirit-trapping pouch. He later found A-Qing and killed her by digging her eyes and cutting her tongue out.

Xiao Xingchen (晓星尘)
Voiced by: Chen Hao (audio drama), Shinnosuke Tachibana (Japanese drama cd), Kaito Ishikawa (Japanese dub)

Xiao Xingchen was one of Baoshan Sanren's (抱山散人) disciples who left the mountain for the mortal world. At some point he became blind, giving his eyes to his best friend, Song Lan. Xiao Xinghen first met A-Qing, then found an injured person, Xue Yang, lying unconscious on the street, and the three of them started living together. Due to Xiao Xingchen's blindness, he neither recognized the man he had saved as the criminal Xue Yang, nor that the latter had tricked him into killing people. When he found out that Xue Yang had tricked him into killing Song Lan, he committed suicide, shattering his soul.

Song Lan (宋岚), courtesy name Zichen (子琛).
Voiced by: Wu Lei (audio drama), Miki Shinichiro (Japanese drama cd), Takuya Eguchi (Japanese dub)

Song Lan is a cultivator from Baixue Temple and a friend of Xiao Xingchen. His eyes were blinded by Xue Yang when Baixue Temple was destroyed, but Xiao Xingchen dug out his own eyes, transferred them to him, and then disappeared. While searching for Xiao Xingchen after his sudden disappearance, he ran into Xue Yang first. Xue Yang cut out his tongue and tricked Xiao Xingchen into killing him. Xue Yang turned him into a fierce corpse, but Wei Wuxian managed to return his consciousness.

A-Qing (阿箐)
Voiced by: Yang Neng (audio drama), Shitaya Noriko (Japanese drama cd), Aoi Yūki (Japanese dub)

A-Qing was a young girl who lived in the streets and pretended to be blind thanks to her white pupils. She encountered Xiao Xingchen and started living with him and Xue Yang. She eventually saw Xue Yang trick Xiao Xingchen into killing Song Lan, and ran away at Xiao Xingchen's request. Xue Yang found her and carved out her eyes and tongue, killing her. Her ghost later tried to warn Wei Wuxian, Lan Wangji, and the juniors who had entered coffin city about Xue Yang. To learn more about her story, Wei Wuxian used a rite to see, feel, and hear her memories.

Soundtrack

Reception
The series received overwhelmingly positive reviews for its high production quality and storyline, and amassed a notable Internet fandom both in China and overseas. On Douban, Mo Dao Zu Shi rated 8.9 out of 10, making it one of the best received donghua series in China in 2018.

The series has since become a worldwide hit, ultimately generating 4.63 billion views on Tencent's streaming platform . The series holds a rating of 9.5 out of 10 on both Tencent and WeTV platforms, cementing its status as one of the most acclaimed donghua series in the world.

Awards and nominations

International Broadcast

Outside China, Mo Dao Zu Shi was officially released by Tencent on its official YouTube channel on August 27, 2019. It was also released by WeTV, a streaming platform for overseas users created by Tencent, under the title of The Founder of Diabolism.<ref>{{cite web|url=https://wetv.vip/play?cid=r8t02fkxr9jyvvn|title=The Founder of Diabolism|website=WeTV|access-date=2019-08-29}}</ref> The WeTV app provides official subtitles in English, Spanish, Portuguese, Thai, and Indonesian, while YouTube provided subtitles for at least 12 different languages for the first few episodes.

On September 30, 2019, Laftel's Twitter account announced the donghua's South Korean broadcast, both in dubbed and subtitled format. Season 1's subtitled version aired from November 11 to December 29, 2019  while the dubbed version aired from April 3 to June 14, 2020. For Season 2, the subtitled version aired from January 11 to February 2, 2020  while the dubbed version aired from June 28 to July 19, 2020. The dubbed version starred Shim Gyu-huk as Wei Wuxian and Ryu Seung-gon as Lan Wangji. Mo Dao Zu Shi Q subtitled version aired from December 3, 2020 to February 14, 2021.

On September 7, 2020, a dubbed version of the donghua started airing on the Russian cable network FAN Film channel.

In Japan, the subtitled version for Seasons 1 and 2 were broadcast on WOWOW network on September 9 and November 4, 2020, and Season 3 on November 10, 2022. The dubbed version was produced by Aniplex and Sony Music Solutions and starred Ryohei Kimura as Wei Wuxian and Shinnosuke Tachibana as Lan Wangji, with Seasons 1 and 2 airing from January 10 to June 13, 2021. Blu-ray discs for Season 1 came out on April 21, 2021  and Season 2 on June 23, 2021. Both Blu-ray sets include the Japanese dub version as well as the original Chinese audio with Japanese subtitles. Mo Dao Zu Shi Q'' subtitled version is available for streaming on Rakuten TV. It won 1st place in the Anime Top 5 category during the first half period of Rakuten TV Award 2022, based on the number of units sold from December 2021 to May 2022.

Notes

References

2018 Chinese television series debuts
Chinese animated television series
Mandarin-language television shows
Television shows based on Chinese novels
Television series by Tencent Penguin Pictures
2010s LGBT-related drama television series
LGBT-related animated series
Chinese fantasy television series
LGBT speculative fiction television series
Chinese boys' love television series